Guan Ziyan (born 16 November 2000) is a Chinese freestyle skier. She competed in the 2018 Winter Olympics, in the moguls event.

References

2000 births
Living people
Freestyle skiers at the 2018 Winter Olympics
Chinese female freestyle skiers
Olympic freestyle skiers of China